Resurrection is the twentieth studio album by American singer-songwriter Bobby Womack. The album was released on August 16, 1994, by Continuum Records.

Track listing

Personnel
Bobby Womack - vocals, guitar, arrangements
Keith Richards, Michael Thompson, Ronnie Wood, Scott McKinstry - guitar
Larry Kimpel - bass guitar
Dana Greene, Frank "Rusty" Hamilton, Patrick Moten - keyboards
Arnold Ramsey, Charlie Watts, Gus Anthony Flores - drums
Lloyd Tolbert - drums, keyboards
Earl Mallory, Eddie Synigal, Gerald Albright - saxophone
Bernard Baisden, Bob Mauzey, Joe Campbell - trombone
The Valentinos - backing vocals
Dana Greene (track: 13), Jodi M. Laba (tracks: 1, 10, 12), Rod Stewart (track: 4), Ronald Isley (track: 7) - vocals

References

1994 albums
Bobby Womack albums
Albums produced by Bobby Womack

Continuum Records albums